Beyond Colossal is Dozer's fifth studio album. It was recorded at Studios 301, Stockholm and Rockhouse Studios, Borlänge. The record was mixed at Tri-Lamb Studios by their former drummer Karl Daniel Lidén. Beyond Colossal was released on Small Stone Records.

Track listing 
All tracks by Dozer

 "The Flood" - 3:51
 "Exoskeleton, Pt. II" - 6:34
 "Empire's End" - 3:55
 "The Ventriloquist" - 4:56
 "Grand Inquisitor" - 4:12
 "Message Through the Horses" - 3:01
 "The Throne" - 3:25
 "Fire for Crows" - 3:58
 "Two Coins for Eyes" - 6:51
 "Bound for Greatness" - 3:29

Personnel 
 Fredrik Nordin - vocals, guitar
 Tommi Holappa - lead guitar 
 Johan Rockner - bass
 Olle Mårthans - drums

Guests 
 Additional vocals on "Empire's End" and "Two coins for eyes" by Neil Fallon.
 Hammond Organ on "Bound for Greatness" by Jocke.

Artist 
Artwork and album design done by Nathan Lavertue.

References 

Dozer albums
2008 albums